ISTE may refer to:
 International Society for Technology in Education
 Indian Society for Technical Education
 ISTE Ltd

See also
 İste, a 2004 maxi single by Mustafa Sandal